Eucithara planilabrum is a small sea snail, a marine gastropod mollusk in the family Mangeliidae.

Description
The length of the shell varies between 14 mm and 17 mm.

The shell  isovately oblong. Its color is reddish brown. The  whorls are onvex, lineated spirally, ribbed longitudinally, ribs almost obsolete. The aperture is oblong. The red outer lip  is flat and denticulated within. The siphonal canal is very short.

Distribution
This marine species occurs off the Philippines and Timor.

References

External links
  Tucker, J.K. 2004 Catalog of recent and fossil turrids (Mollusca: Gastropoda). Zootaxa 682:1-1295.
 

planilabrum
Gastropods described in 1843